Aldisa sanguinea, common name the blood-spot dorid, is a species of sea slug, a dorid nudibranch, a marine gastropod mollusk in the family Cadlinidae.

Distribution 
This species was described from California. It has subsequently been recorded on the western seaboard of North America from British Columbia south to Mexico. In the north of this range, in Oregon and British Columbia, specimens are found which lack the two characteristic round markings on the back resembling the inhalant pore sieves of Hymedesmiid sponges. It is possible that these belong to a separate species.

Ecology
This species feeds on a red Hymedesmia sponge.

References

Cadlinidae
Gastropods described in 1863